Benin–Kenya relations are bilateral relations between Benin and Kenya. Both nations are members of the African Union and the United Nations.

History
In 2017, President Patrice Talon of Benin made his first state visit to Nairobi. He held talks with President Kenyatta where they discussed deepening both trade and diplomatic ties.

Trade
Both countries enjoy cordial relations. Nationals of both countries can obtain Visas at the Port of Entry. To increase trade a Joint Commission for Co-operation (JCC) between the two countries is in the works.

Annual trade is considered to be worth Kes. 94 million (US$1 million- US$1.5 million) depending on exchange rates. In 2009, Kenya imported goods worth Kes. 61 million (US$668,000) and exported goods worth Kes. 33 million (US$361,000) to Benin. The balance of trade favoured Benin then.

In 2015, the balance of trade was in favour of Kenya with Kenya exporting goods worth Kes. 377.35 million (US$3.65 million) and Benin exporting a minimal number of goods to Kenya.

Main goods that Kenya exports to Benin are medicines, sugar confectionery, jute and other textiles.

Kenya's main imports from Benin include; Liquefied propane and butane, rotating electric plant and parts, paper and art works.

Diplomatic missions
 Benin is accredited to Kenya from its embassy in Addis Ababa, Ethiopia.
 Kenya is accredited to Benin from its high commission in Abuja, Nigeria.

See also 
 Foreign relations of Benin
 Foreign relations of Kenya

References

 
Kenya
Benin